"Bad Love" is a song recorded by South Korean singer Key serving as the second single for his 2021 extended play of the same name. It was released on September 27, 2021, through SM Entertainment as the album's lead single. The song was written by Kenzie, who also handled the composition and arrangement with Adrian McKinnon.

Background and release
On September 6, 2021, SM Entertainment announced the upcoming release date of Key's first Korean-language extended play, Bad Love, led by the single of the same name. The first single from the EP, "Hate That...", had already been released a month prior. Key showcased the song for the first time at his Beyond Live concert, Groks in the Keyland, on September 26, 2021, before releasing it alongside the album on the next day. Two music video teasers were released on September 25 and September 26, respectively. The song together with the music video were released on September 27.

Composition
"Bad Love" was written by Kenzie. Musically, the song is described as a dance-pop song that creates a retro mood with a strong synth sound and a lively beat. The lyrics revolve around "a tale of ecstatic love turned toxic".

Critical reception

Accolades

Credits and personnel
Credits adapted from the liner notes for Bad Love.

Studio
 SM Big Shot Studio – recording
 SM Yellow Tail Studio – engineering for mix
 SM Starlight Studio - digital editing

Personnel

 Key – vocals, background vocals
 Junny - background vocals
 Kenzie – vocal directing, lyrics, composition, arrangement
 Adrian McKinnon – composition
 Lee Min-gyu – recording
 Jung Yu-ra - digital editing
 No Min-ji – engineering for mix
 Nam Koong-jin - mixing

Charts

Release history

References

2021 songs
2021 singles
Korean-language songs
SM Entertainment singles
Songs written by Kenzie (songwriter)
Key (entertainer) songs